Azize Dilpesend Kadın ("Highly Esteemed" and "likeable to heart"; 16 January 1865 – 17 June 1901) was the fifth consort of Sultan Abdul Hamid II of the Ottoman Empire.

Life
Of Georgian origin, Dilpesend Kadın was born on 16 January 1865 in Tbilisi, Georgia. Born as Azize Hanim, she was the daughter of Kızılbeg Maksud Giray Bey and his wife Esma Hanım. She had a brother named Midhat Bey, and two sisters named Mestiahu Hanım and Pakize Hanım. By father's part, she was a descendant of Giray dynasty, Khan of Crimea. She was tall, had dark brown-black hair, and wheat complexion. She is the least known of Abdülhamid II's consorts, so much so that she is often confused with another consort with a similar name, Pesend Hanım.

Before her marriage to Abdülhamid II, she served in the entourage of Tiryal Hanım, last consort of Sultan Mahmud II, grandfather of Abdülhamid II. After her death in 1883, as custom dictated, all of Tiryal Hanım's servants were transferred to Dolmabahçe Palace or Yıldız Palace, where Abdülhamid II looked at her and chose her as his consort.

Dilpesend married Abdul Hamid on 10 April 1883. She was given the title of "Fourth Kadın". On, 9 January 1884, a year after the marriage, she gave birth to her first child, a daughter, Naile Sultan. She was followed by another daughter, Seniha Sultan, in 1885, who died at the age of five months. In 1895, she was elevated to the title of "Third Kadın".

Death
Dilpesend Kadın died on 17 June 1901, at the age of thirty-six, in the Yıldız Palace, and was buried in Yahya Efendi Cemetery, Istanbul.

Issue

See also
Kadın (title)
Ottoman Imperial Harem
List of consorts of the Ottoman sultans

References

Sources

1865 births
1903 deaths
19th-century consorts of Ottoman sultans
Georgians from the Ottoman Empire
Abdul Hamid II